Beechwood is a census-designated place (CDP) in Warren County, Mississippi, United States. The population was 3,469 at the 2020 census.

Demographics

2020 census

Note: the US Census treats Hispanic/Latino as an ethnic category. This table excludes Latinos from the racial categories and assigns them to a separate category. Hispanics/Latinos can be of any race.

References

Census-designated places in Mississippi
Census-designated places in Warren County, Mississippi